The Oblongs is an American adult animated sitcom created by Angus Oblong and Jace Richdale. It was Mohawk Productions' first venture into animation. The series premiered on April 1, 2001 on The WB, and was removed on May 20th, leaving the last five episodes unaired. The remaining episodes were later aired on Cartoon Network's late-night programming block Adult Swim in August 2002, and later aired on Teletoon's "Teletoon Unleashed" (later become former block Teletoon at Night) block. The series is loosely based on a series of characters introduced in a picture book entitled Creepy Susie and 13 Other Tragic Tales for Troubled Children.

Three networks had a bidding war to win the rights to turn Angus Oblong's characters into a series: Fox, the WB, and ABC. Warner Bros. won the bidding to turn Oblong's characters into a series; and thus, the series was submitted to the WB. The show was produced by Film Roman, Oblong Productions, Jobsite Productions and Mohawk Productions in association with Warner Bros. Television, and the theme song for the series was composed and performed by They Might Be Giants. This was the only animated series to date to have been produced by Bruce Helford under Mohawk.

A total of 13 episodes were produced. All thirteen episodes of The Oblongs were released on DVD on October 4, 2005.

As of February 2022, the series is available on Tubi.

Setting and premise
The series focuses on the antics of a family who live in a poor valley community and, as a result of pollution and radiation exposure, are all disabled or deformed.  The pollution is the direct result of the lavish lifestyle of the rich community known as "The Hills", whose residents exploit and harm the valley residents with absolutely no regard for their safety or well-being.

Social commentary
Many reviewers and fans see the series as a commentary on social stratification.

Characters

The Oblong family
 Bob Oblong (Will Ferrell) – Born with no arms or legs, Bob works at a poison factory called the Globocide. Despite his deformities, he is very chipper and sunny, and modeled after various fathers from 1950s TV shows. He has a happy-go-lucky attitude. He is married to Pickles and is the father of Biff, Chip, Milo, and Beth. The only time he had limbs was in the episode "My Name is Robbie". While he mostly uses his mouth for tasking, he can often drive with his mind in various episodes, or read a newspaper with his mind, as seen in "Flush, Flush, Sweet Helga", which assumes that he may have mind powers.
 Marie "Pickles" Oblong (Jean Smart) – A chain smoking alcoholic who was originally a Hill resident but moved to the valley after marrying Bob. Due to the hazardous atmosphere of The Valley, all of her hair has since fallen out (something which is usually hidden by an extremely tall blonde beehive wig), and she is now regarded as an outcast by her former Hill friends. While not bitter about losing her privileged life, she often expresses disdain towards her self-centered former neighbors in the Hills. She is the mother of Biff, Chip, Milo, and Beth.
 Biff Oblong (Randy Sklar) and Chip Oblong (Jason Sklar) – 17-year-old conjoined twins who are attached at the waist and share a middle leg. Biff is a hard worker obsessed with sports, while Chip is more laid back. It is frequently implied that Biff is gay and attracted to their coach; however, there are instances when the two are seen lusting after girls together (possibly implying Biff as bisexual). Biff and Chip each occasionally go into "trances" to give the other brother privacy.
 Milo Oblong (Pamela Adlon) – The youngest son. Often referred to by other kids as a "psycho", he is afflicted with numerous mental and social disorders and is on "everything from Ritalin to Rogaine". Despite his afflictions, he is a very forthright and benevolent boy, though he envies the Hill lifestyle and wishes to rise above his economic status. He has a single hair sticking up on his head and a squint in one eye (which also occasionally twitches), and often wears a shirt that says "NO".
 Beth Oblong (Jeannie Elias) – The youngest child and only daughter, she has a warty, elongated growth growing out of her head. Despite her appendage, she is shown to be better adjusted than the rest of her family. In the episode "Pickles' Little Amazons", it is revealed that the growth on her head is the result of eating meat containing bovine growth hormones. In the episode "My Name is Robbie", it is revealed that her birthday is June 7.
 Grammy Oblong – Bob's vegetative mother who resides in a motorized wheelchair and is unable to speak. Instead, she communicates using a green light which means yes, a red light which means no, and a flashing red light which means she has soiled herself and that her diaper needs changing.
 Lucky – The one-lunged family cat who chain-smokes cigarettes and wears an uninterested, deadpan expression.
 Scottie – Milo's narcoleptic dog, a result of perfume used on him during his tenure as a test animal at Globocide. Scottie was based on the short story "Narcoleptic Scottie" in Creepy Susie.

Milo's friends, "The Clubhouse Kids"
 Helga Phugly (Lea DeLaria) – An overweight, toad-like girl who will eat virtually anything. She lives in a fantasy world, believing that she is pretty and popular and that the "Debbies'" actually like her (she stubbornly believes this, as when told that the Debbies hate her, she covered her ears, shut her eyes, and started stomping around humming very loudly).  At times, she is shown to have a crush on Milo, leading to her kidnapping him in the episode "Milo Interrupted". When her parents went on vacation and never returned, Helga was forced to live at home by herself, eating only rejected wedding cakes from a nearby wedding cake factory and the occasional animal that she spotted.  Milo eventually locates her parents when Mrs. Hubbard, a Bible-thumping, gun-toting old woman, tries to adopt Helga.  Her last name, Phugly, is derived from the word "fugly", which is a term short for "fucking ugly".
 Creepy Susie (Jeannie Elias) – A melancholic goth girl who speaks with a deadpan French accent and appears to float instead of walk, as her legs are never shown.  She is obsessed with death, and has a problem with pyromania, but it has been revealed she does enjoy hula hoops.
 Peggy (Becky Thyre) – A girl who has one breast and lacks a lower jaw, causing her to spit and talk with a lisp.  Despite her deformities, Peggy is cheerful and upbeat.  The daughter of a male gay couple, she dreams of being president and marrying a handsome speech therapist.
 Mikey (Jeannie Elias) – A boy saddled with a dangling, doubled posterior. Standard underwear will not fit him, so he wears his grandmother's old bra like backwards suspenders.  He is also known to habitually probe his nose and ears with his finger. Because of his larger deformed posterior, he takes jokes about the area more literally especially since they often come true soon after. As a running gag, he is inflicted with severe misfortune in almost every appearance, ranging from being stung by bees to being attacked by dogs.

The Hill residents
 George Klimer (Billy West) – Bob's rich and snobby boss. He represents the power and arrogance of the people of the Hills.  He is very condescending to his employees, especially Bob and James. He is husband to Pristine and father of Jared and Debbie Klimer.
 Pristine Klimer (Becky Thyre) – The wife of George and mother to Jared and Debbie. Pristine was good friends with Pickles before she married Bob, but abandoned her once she went to live in the valley.
 Jared Klimer (Pamela Adlon) – The arrogant son of George and Pristine and brother to Debbie.  He likes to taunt The Clubhouse Kids, along with his equally snobbish best friend Blaine. He calls Milo "Obdong". In the episode "Get Off My Back", Milo retorts with the information that a rumor of Jared and Blaine claims the two have had sex with each other. Jared even said he goes to therapy in "Milo Interrupted" episode.
 Blaine (Billy West) – He is Jared Kilmer's best friend and usually picks on the other kids with his buddy. Although the two are usually just friends, many believe the two are gay, usually being together often.
 Debbie Klimer (Becky Thyre; Pamela Adlon, in some episodes) – The only daughter of George and Pristine Klimer, and sister of Jared. She is the leader of the Debbies and is considered the most beautiful and popular girl in school, even though all of her friends are identical. Like most Hill residents, she often treats the people in the Valley with cruelty. She is also a Debbie of her own as she had been the only one to change to liking the valley life in the episode "disfigured Debbie" as she became a freak (after she fell into a woodchipper being pushed by the other Debbies during the election of their school) while she slowly joined the clubhouse kids, they had to get her back to normal because of how much of a pain she is around based on pickles words of "bitch gotta go!" Although she does become normal after the help of nurse Rench, she is a bit sad having to become a jerk again. Although she will always reminder her best friends giving them one final hug before joining the Debbies once more. She is the only Debbie with her last name known, besides Debbie Bledsoe.
 The Debbies (Becky Thyre, Pamela Adlon in some episodes) – A popular clique of identical girls who all look exactly the same and are all named Debbie. Despite them all being identical, each Debbie is the daughter of a different wealthy Hill resident, with no relation. They seem to be a symbol of how most popular people tend to be conformists and lack individuality. The Debbies are often cruel to the Valley kids, especially Helga, who aspires to be accepted by them.
 Mayor Johnny "The Mayor" Bledsoe (Billy West) – The town's mayor and a masked pro wrestler. He is corrupt, and his daughter is a Debbie.
 Debbie Bledsoe (Becky Thyre, Pamela Adlon in some episodes) – She is the daughter of the mayor we only focus on her when she is given a locket on her birthday from her daddy "Mayor Johnny". She gets upset when Helga wears it but is happy getting it back and repaired only to lose in the sewers again by a launched Helga.
 Leland Bergstein (Billy West) – The kids' homeroom teacher, who is shown to be weak and easily cowed by the Debbies and the rich residents of the town. It is revealed that he lives in the Hills, as seen in the episode "Milo Interrupted".
 Sheriff Pepper (Maurice LaMarche) – Hill Valley's inept, corrupt law enforcer.  He favors the people of the Hills and provides better law enforcement for them.
 Dr. Hofschneider (Billy West) – The Oblongs' condescending and uninterested doctor.
 Mrs. Hubbard (Laraine Newman) – The town's Bible-thumping, gun-toting old woman who is appointed czar of child and family services after a disturbance in the Hills is blamed on valley kids. She is a spinster who never married or had children.  She wears a chastity belt called "The Forni-Guard 2000".

The Valley residents
 Anita Bidet (Billy West) – The owner of the bar Pickles frequents, The Rusty Bucket. Her name is a play on the phrase "I need a bidet."  It is implied that she is transgender.  Her assumed male form (when originally named "Andy") is seen during a flashback of how Bob and Pickles met, although when questioned about it in the present, Anita claims that she had a brother.
 Nurse Rench (Laraine Newman) – The school nurse who is described by Peggy as "a godless butcher without a shred of legitimate medical training".  She has a scary operating contraption in place of her right arm, has four breasts arranged in a pattern resembling a cow's udder, and a deformed left hand.
 James (Billy West) – Bob's hunchbacked co-worker. He is a people-pleaser and lacks self-esteem, buying friends on eBay to attend his bachelor party. He's shown to be transsexual, in love with Anita Bidet.

Minor characters
 Yvette (Michelle Ruff) – An additional member of the Debbies, the only one who does not carry the same name.  An extraterrestrial masquerading as a human, she has long blonde hair in a ponytail.  She takes an interest in Milo, though only to experiment on his brain.  When it appears that Milo has been killed, she is forced to self-destruct, as it is more cost-effective than returning to her base of operations.  She only appeared in the episode "Misfit Love".
 Principal Davis (Debra Wilson) – The African-American school principal.  She appeared in the episode "Disfigured Debbie".
 Homeless Bill (Billy West) – Hill Valley's resident street urchin.  He appeared in the episodes "Narcoleptic Scottie" and "Bucketheads".
 The Girl with a Beak (Becky Thyre) – An aptly named, bird-like classmate of The Clubhouse Kids.  She often is spurned by the kids despite their own maladies.  She was never given an actual name.  She appeared in the episodes "Narcoleptic Scottie" and "Bucketheads".
 Coach (Will Ferrell) – Biff and Chip's school coach, with whom Biff has an unhealthy obsession.  He also teaches the sex and driver's education classes; however, he seems to confuse the two.  He appeared in the episode "Bucketheads".
 Verdelle Diver (Lea DeLaria) – The regional coordinator of The Li'l Amazons, a Girl Scouts-like troop.  She and the organization in general are implied to be lesbian (hence her last name, referring to the slur "muff diver").  Verdelle hits on Pickles frequently during Pickles' court-ordered tenure as Beth's den mother.  She appeared in the episode "Pickles' Little Amazons".
 Tommy Vinegar (Maurice LaMarche) – Pickles' ex-boyfriend.  He got rich after Pickles taught him how to be cool and popular, and then promptly dumped her after all his coolness went to his head. He appeared in the episode "Bucketheads".
 Velva, the Warrior (Pamela Adlon) – A version of Xena, whom Beth adores.  Her name is a pun on "vulva", and her show has heavy lesbian/anti-male overtones (all of the villains are male while all the heroes are female), not to mention blatant advertising of Velva merchandise and numerous genital references. Her sidekick is named Majora, she has a horse named Fallopious, and a pet bird named Placentor.  She appeared in the episode "Heroine Addict".
 Dusty (Becky Thyre) – Bob's one-time co-worker and a lifeguard.  It is heavily suggested that she has had a lot of cosmetic surgery.  She appeared in the episode "My Name Is Robbie".
 Courtney (Becky Thyre) – Chip's girlfriend who only appears in "Get Off My Back". Not much is known about her, but she seems to be live somewhere in the Valley. Her deformity is unknown, however. She also gets easily annoyed, as shown when she wishes that Milo would also go into a trance alongside Biff, during a date with Chip and accuses him of trying to grab her breasts. However, she seems to be easily moved, as Milo is able to prevent her from abandoning Chip when he says that his brother thinks she "has a beautiful soul."

Episodes

Broadcast
The show premiered on April 1, 2001 on The WB but failed to find an audience. On May 20, 2001, The WB aired "Disfigured Debbie," the second episode produced, as the season finale, leaving five episodes unaired. Reruns of the first eight episodes, and the five remaining episodes, aired on Cartoon Network's late-night programming block, Adult Swim, in 2002. Reruns of the series continued to air on Adult Swim until March 29, 2015. In Canada, the series airs on Teletoon as part of "Teletoon Unleashed".

In Australia, the show premiered on the Nine Network on December 8, 2001, however due to insufficient ratings, it was withdrawn after one episode, but was eventually shown in a late-night/early morning time slot. The series aired from 2004 to 2006, on TBS's late-night programming block, Too Funny To Sleep. And aired on the channel again from 2013 to 2015

Home media
The entire series was released on two disc DVD set in the United States on October 4, 2005.

Awards and nominations
The Oblongs won the Artios award in 2001 for Best Casting for Animated Voiceover – Television Mary V. Buck Susan Edelman.

See also
 Creepy Susie and 13 Other Tragic Tales for Troubled Children
 Angus Oblong

References

External links

 
 
 

2000s American adult animated television series
2000s American black comedy television series
2000s American sitcoms
2000s American surreal comedy television series
2001 American television series debuts
2002 American television series endings
American adult animated comedy television series
Animated television series about dysfunctional families
English-language television shows
Fictional characters with disfigurements
Television series by Film Roman
Television series by Mohawk Productions
Television series by Warner Bros. Animation
Television series by Warner Bros. Television Studios
Television shows about disability
Television shows based on books
The WB original programming
Works about social class
Works by Angus Oblong